Las Vegas Stars is a professional sports team nickname that can refer to:
 Las Vegas Stars (baseball), a Minor League Baseball team of the Pacific Coast League from 1983 to 2000
 Las Vegas Stars (IBL), a minor league basketball team of the International Basketball League from 2007 to 2008